Perlis United Football Club, or simply known as the Perlis United, is a Malaysian professional football club based in Kangar, Perlis. They currently play in the second division of the Malaysian football league system, the Malaysia M3 League.

Background
KSK Tambun Tulang was formed on 18 April 2003 to oversee footballing activities throughout the state of Perlis. Although a formal association was formed in 2003, Tambun Tulang has actually had a football team since 2002.  In 2020 KSK Tambun Tulang was renamed as Perlis United and now compete in Malaysia M3 League.

Players

First-team squad

Management team

Club personnel
 Manager: Mohd Irfan Aznan
 Head coach: Azhar Abdul Rahman
 Goalkeeping coach: Aizul Nizam Abu Bakar
 Physio : Muhd Nasir Othman
 Club doctor: Azrulhisham Norulhadi

Honours

Domestic competitions

League 
Malaysia FAM League
  Runners-up (1): 2009

 Perlis Amateur League
  Winners (1) :2019

References

Malaysia Premier League clubs
Football clubs in Malaysia
ATM FA
Malaysia M3 League
Sport in Perlis